Lü Shuhai (born 20 July 1966) is a Chinese speed skater. He competed in the men's 10,000 metres event at the 1988 Winter Olympics.

References

External links
 

1966 births
Living people
Chinese male speed skaters
Olympic speed skaters of China
Speed skaters at the 1988 Winter Olympics
Place of birth missing (living people)
Asian Games medalists in speed skating
Speed skaters at the 1986 Asian Winter Games
Speed skaters at the 1990 Asian Winter Games
Medalists at the 1986 Asian Winter Games
Medalists at the 1990 Asian Winter Games
Asian Games silver medalists for China
Asian Games bronze medalists for China
20th-century Chinese people